Juan Margallo (born 24 September 1940) is a Spanish actor, theater director and dramaturge. He has been considered one of the main actors in the Spanish theater. He has worked with Miguel Narros, Luis Escobar Kirkpatrick and José Tamayo. In 1976 he played Woyzeck, by Georg Büchner and La sangre y la ceniza, by Alfonso Sastre. He was awarded the prestigious national award 'Premio Nacional de Teatro 2022'.

In 2011 he founded with his spouse Petra Martínez the Uroc Teatro, which received the Medalla de Oro al Mérito en las Bellas Artes.

Filmography

TV series

References

Bibliography

External links

 

1940 births
Living people
Spanish male stage actors
Spanish male film actors
20th-century Spanish male actors
21st-century Spanish male actors